Darina Kodajová (born 26 June 1950) is a Slovak volleyball player. She competed in the women's tournament at the 1972 Summer Olympics.

References

1950 births
Living people
Slovak women's volleyball players
Olympic volleyball players of Czechoslovakia
Volleyball players at the 1972 Summer Olympics
Sportspeople from Bratislava